Alec Crawford Snowden (1901–1983) was a British film producer.

He was the son of Agnes Adamson Wallace née Crawford and the novelist J. Keighley Snowden.

Selected filmography
 Little Red Monkey (1955)
 The Brain Machine (1955)
 Confession (1955)
 The Intimate Stranger (1956)
 The Key Man (1957)
 This Other Eden (1959)

References

External links

1901 births
1983 deaths
People from Keighley
British film producers
20th-century British businesspeople